Avionne Mark (born February 11, 1989) is a Trinidadian model and beauty queen who won Miss Trinidad & Tobago 2012. She rightfully earned the opportunity to represent her country in Miss Universe 2012.

References

External links
Official Miss Trinidad and Tobago website

1989 births
Living people
Trinidad and Tobago beauty pageant winners
Miss Universe 2012 contestants